Colonel Antoine-Louis Henri de Polier (1741–1795) was a  Swiss adventurer, art collector, military engineer and soldier who made his fortune in India in the eighteenth century. He was the father of Count Adolphe de Polier.

Life

Antoine-Louis was born in Lausanne from a French Huguenot family who emigrated to Switzerland in the mid 16th century to escape the wars of religion. He was the youngest son of Jacques-Henri de Polier and his wife Jeanne-Françoise Moreau. He later learned Hindi and Persian.

Antoine Polier was an engineer from Lausanne who supported the military adventures of Robert Clive and later became a rich trader and loyal supporter of the British Raj administration in Calcutta. He devoted his free moments to collecting rare manuscripts in Sanskrit, Persian and Arabic. Many were sent back to France to augment the growing collection in the Royal Library. France was now the center for the study of ancient Indian languages and its 'orientalism' spread to Germany in the early 1800s as Europe began to show a keen interest in early Indian-Persian-Zoroastrian origins. He designed the Bibiyapur Kothi, a royal residence outside of Lucknow.

On learning Indian mythology, Polier notes:

When one begins such a study without the advantage of possessing the Samscrite[Sanskrit], or sacred, tongue of the Indous, which the Pundits or savants so constantly draw upon in their usual discourse that it is difficult for me to follow them in their conversation, even though I have a deep knowledge [je possédé à fond] of the common tongue of India, called Moors by the English, and Ourdouzebain by the natives of the land.

In India, he had two Indian wives, Jugnu and Zinat, one senior and one junior and three (or possibly, four) children who were all baptized in Calcutta. He acquired a large art collection and became rich working for the Indian royalty. In 1788 he left his Indian wives with his loyal companion and fellow enlightened adventurer, Claude Martin. and settled in France with an unfortunate timing as he arrived in time for the French revolution. Having purchased a chateau and taking a French wife and two children, Charles de Polier and Adolphe de Polier. He was assassinated in Avignon on February 9, 1795, in the terror that followed the French revolution.

Legacy

Polier's Mythology of the Hindus was edited by his cousin, Marie-Elisabeth Polier, for posthumous publication. Polier, who felt he had lost the ability to express himself easily in French or English as a result of his travels, dictated an autobiographical preface to her. Sanjay Subrahmanyam has suggested that her lack of knowledge of Indian geography may have introduced inconsistencies into the text.

Polier's collection of miniatures are in Berlin.

See also
Claude Martin

References

Further reading
 A European Experience of the Mughal Orient: The I’jaz-i Arsalani (Persian Letters, 1773–1779) of Antoine-Louis-Henri Polier - Translated with an introduction by Muzaffar Alam and Seema Alavi. Pub.Oxford University Press 
 Jean-Marie Lafont, Indika. Essays in Indo-French Relations 1630-1976. New Delhi 2000. [An extremely useful book outlining French activities in India during Polier's time] 

Articles containing image maps
1741 births
1795 deaths
French explorers
French businesspeople
British East India Company people
People from Lausanne
Swiss engineers
People murdered in France